Wikki Tourists Football Club is a Nigerian football club based in Bauchi, and currently playing in the Nigeria Premier league after promotion from the second-tier Nigeria National League after the 2014 season.Sponsor is Bauchi State Government

Achievements
Nigerian FA Cup: 1
1998--Winner

Nigeria National League: 1
2011--Winner

Shehu Dukko Cup: 1
2015--Winner
State FA Cup: 13
1998-1999-2003-2004-2006-2007-2008-2011-2012-2015-2016-2017-2019--Winner

Performance in CAF competitions
CAF Cup Winners' Cup: 1 appearance
1999 – Second Round

CAF Confederation Cup: 2 appearances
2008 – First Round
2017 – First Round

Current players
As of 25 December, 2021.

Staff

Chairman
 Balarabe Yusuf

Team manager
 Yakubu Yankari

Technical Adviser
 Usman Abd'Allah

Chief coach
 Nasiru Salisu

Asst. coach
  Baba Jibrin

Goalkeeper trainer
  Haruna Abubakar

Trainor 1
  Wada Jibrin

Trainor 2
  Dantani Yahaya

Media Officer
 Nasiru Abdullahi Kobi

Team doctor
 Umar Abubakar

Co-odinator
 Yakubu Yankari

Welfare Officer
  Shehu Maijama'a

Welfare Officer 2
 Rabiu Abdullahi

Scouting Officer
  Iliya Yahaya

Former managers
, Musa Abdullahi
  Abdul Maikaba

  Muhammad Baba Ganaru

  Ladan Bosso

  Tunde Abdulrahman

  Abdullahi Maidajin

 Bala Nikyau

  Aliyu zubairu
  Usman Abd'Allah
  Abubakar Ibrahim

References

External links
 Official website

Football clubs in Nigeria
Bauchi State